Suyen Corporation is a Philippine conglomerate most known for the clothing brand Bench. It was founded by Ben Chan who also serves as the chairman of the company. The company's name came from "Suyen" the name of the daughter of Nenita Lim, Chan's sister which is also the namesake of a children's boutique brand of the same name opened by Lim.

It is headquartered at the Bench Tower at the Bonifacio Global City in Taguig, Metro Manila.

Brands
Suyen Corporation is most well-known for its clothing brand Bench which is the flagship brand of the company. it also owns other local clothing brands such as Human and Secret Fresh for streetwear plus Kashieca and Herbench, which both caters to young women. Suyen also manages Bench sub-brands like Bench Body, Bench Active,  Bench Beauty, Bench Skin Expert, Bench Fix Salon, Bench Barbers. and Bench Cafe. Suyen is also the distributor of products of the various clothing, apparel and cosmetics foreign brands in the Philippines

Since the 1990s, Suyen Corporation has been aggressively expanding its portfolio with one vision in mind -- to build a network of partnerships with the most exciting brands from all around the world. This portfolio now includes the Philippine operations for foreign fashion brands like 6ixty8ight, Aldo, American Eagle, Charles & Keith, Cotton On, La Senza, La Vie En Rose, Paul Smith, Pedro, Rubi and Urban Revivo.    

Suyen has also extended its reach towards the beauty and cosmetics category by leading the Philippine operations for brands like Bobbi Brown, Clinique, Estee Lauder, Jo Malone, Khiel's, La Mer, Mac, Origins, PCX and The Faceshop.  This portfolio also includes lifestyle brands like Typo, Mothercare, JINS, Fritz Hansen and Dimensione.  The Covid-19 pandemic also necessitated the need for testing services that the company responded with PCR Med.  

The company is also involved in the food industry, managing the Philippine operations of food brands like Boat Noodle, Maisen, Marugame Udon, Paul Boulangerie and St. Marc's Cafe.  The list also includes beverage brands like Fire Tiger and Koi The plus chocolate brand Patchi.

The Future 
Suyen's portfolio is not just any portfolio. It is the company's creative response to the fast paced and ever-changing reality of today’s global market. It reflects the company's sensibilities, strengths, and worldview. It matches the momentum of the latest trends in retail. Their portfolio encapsulates their understanding of the customers -- what they need and what they desire. But above all else, it is about the company's capacity for versatility and diversity; it is about a creative, entrepreneurial approach to challenges and opportunities.

The very nature of global retail has been irreversibly transformed by new technology and varying customer behaviors in the last several years, and the future, as they say, will be unrecognizable. Despite that, the company firmly believes that the adaptable, multi-faceted and enterprising spirit that put up SUYEN in 1987 is the same spirit that will keep it going in the years to come… So that we will not only be shaped by the future, but we will continue to help shape the future.

References

Companies based in Bonifacio Global City
Holding companies of the Philippines
Conglomerate companies of the Philippines